Alejandro Antonio Buccolini (Jan 18, 1930 – June 6, 2014) was a Roman Catholic bishop.

Ordained to the priesthood in 1957, Buccolini was appointed bishop of the Roman Catholic Diocese of Rio Gallegos, Argentina, in 1992 and retired in 2005.

Notes

1930 births
2014 deaths
20th-century Roman Catholic bishops in Argentina
21st-century Roman Catholic bishops in Argentina
Roman Catholic bishops of Río Gallegos